Dragan Mrđa (born 23 January 1984) is a Serbian football coach and a former forward. At international level he has represented Serbia.

Club career

Early career
After spending many years of his youth playing with Red Star Belgrade, during which he was loaned to FK Jedinstvo Ub, he decided to accept a challenge that came from Belgium and moved to Lierse S.K. in August 2005. In the summer of 2006, he was loaned to another Belgian First Division club, S.V. Zulte Waregem before moving to Russia to play with Premier League club FC Khimki.

Vojvodina
After one season in Russia, he returned to Serbia to join FK Vojvodina in the Serbian SuperLiga. In spite of arriving to the club off of dry spells in Belgium and Russia, he became Vojvodina's captain after a remarkably short period of time due to a spontaneous explosion of good form. His prolific goal-scoring with Vojvodina earned him calls from the Serbian national team from 2008, having been called up for a friendly against Bulgaria and another friendly match against Austria which took place the same year. By the end of the 2009–10 season, Mrđa had scored 22 goals in 29 league games and was named SuperLiga Player of the Year.

Sion
After two seasons spent in Novi Sad, in summer 2010, he signed a 3-year contract with Swiss side FC Sion. In March 2011 in a match against FC Zürich he suffered a serious knee injury which kept him out of football for six months.

Return to Red Star Belgrade
After seasons spent in Sion, Mrđa returned to the club at which he debuted professionally, signing a two-year contract with Red Star Belgrade. On September 29, 2013, he scored a hat-trick in a 5-0 win against FK Spartak Subotica. On November 23, 2013, he scored another hat-trick in a 4–1 win against FK Sloboda Užice, becoming Red Star's highest goal-scorer of the half-season.

Omiya Ardija
On 1 July 2014, Mrđa joined J. League Division 1 club Omiya Ardija. Mrđa scored on his debut on 19 July 2014 helping them to earn a 3–3 draw against Sanfrecce Hiroshima. He played 18 times for Omiya in the 2014 as they suffered relegation to the Division 2.

International career
Mrđa was a part of the Serbian U21 team that made it to the final of the 2007 UEFA European Under-21 Championship, where he scored coming off the bench against the Netherlands U21 side. By the end of the championship he had scored a total of two goals, which was on level with the likes of Ryan Babel. Mrđa scored two goals for the Serbian national team in a 3–0 friendly win against Japan on April 7, 2010. 

In June 2010, he was called up by Radomir Antić to Serbia's squad at the 2010 FIFA World Cup, but didn't make any appearances there.

Career statistics

Club
Updated to 23 February 2017.

International

International goals

References

External links
 
 

 Dragan Mrđa at UEFA

1984 births
Living people
People from Vršac
Serbian footballers
Association football forwards
Serbia youth international footballers
Serbia under-21 international footballers
Serbia international footballers
Red Star Belgrade footballers
FK Jedinstvo Ub players
Lierse S.K. players
S.V. Zulte Waregem players
FC Khimki players
FK Vojvodina players
FC Sion players
Omiya Ardija players
Shonan Bellmare players
NK Olimpija Ljubljana (2005) players
Belgian Pro League players
Russian Premier League players
Serbian SuperLiga players
Swiss Super League players
J1 League players
J2 League players
Slovenian PrvaLiga players
Serbian expatriate footballers
Expatriate footballers in Belgium
Expatriate footballers in Russia
Expatriate footballers in Switzerland
Expatriate footballers in Japan
Expatriate footballers in Slovenia
Serbian expatriate sportspeople in Belgium
Serbian expatriate sportspeople in Russia
Serbian expatriate sportspeople in Switzerland
Serbian expatriate sportspeople in Japan
Serbian expatriate sportspeople in Slovenia
2010 FIFA World Cup players
Serbian football managers
Serbian expatriate football managers
Expatriate football managers in Japan